Pierre Aveline (1656–1722), was a French engraver, print-publisher and print-seller.

Aveline was born in Paris and the head of a family of artists, including his two sons Pierre-Alexandre Aveline and Antoine Aveline. He is best known for his reproductions of other artists' works. He died in Paris on 23 May 1722.

References
 Emmanuel Bénézit Dictionary of painters, sculptors, designers and writers of all times and all countries, Paris, R. And Roger F. Chernoviz, 1911.

External links

1656 births
1722 deaths
17th-century French engravers
18th-century French  engravers
Engravers from Paris